The Neo layout is an optimized German keyboard layout developed in 2004 by the Neo Users Group, supporting nearly all Latin-based alphabets, including the International Phonetic Alphabet, the Vietnamese language, and some Cyrillic languages.

The positions of the letters are optimized not only for German letter frequency, but also for typical groups of two or three letters. English is considered a major target as well. The design tries to enforce the alternating usage of both hands to increase typing speed. It is based on ideas from de-ergo and other ergonomic layouts. The high frequency keys are placed in the home row. The current layout Neo 2.0 has unique features not present in other layouts, making it suited for many target groups such as programmers, mathematicians, scientists and LaTeX authors. Neo is grouped in different layers, each designed for a special purpose.

Neo uses a total of six layers with the following general use: 

 Lowercase characters
 Uppercase characters, typographical characters
 Special characters for programming, etc.
 WASD-like movement keys and number block
 Greek characters
 Mathematical symbols and Greek uppercase characters

Concept

Facilitating Ten Finger Writing 

On the basis of the statistical distribution of letters of the German language and research on ergonomics, the neo-keyboard layout aims to shorten the finger movements during writing.  The most common letters are therefore on the baseline and the fast index and middle fingers.  This allows more words to be written without leaving the baseline compared to other keyboard layouts.

For an average German-language text 63% of all letters can be typed from the baseline with fingers on the home row - in contrast to 25% in the usual QWERTZ-layout.

In addition, using Neo the hands shall alternate as often as possible during writing and their use be evenly distributed - the QWERTY keyboard layout is very left-heavy.

The drafting of the letter positions took into account the experience from other keyboard layout reforms. Instead of pursuing a purely mathematical or experimental path, Neo combines the insights of both paths with the goal of improving both the ergonomics and memorization of the keyboard layout.

Layers 
Neo 2 has a total of six levels.  The first two levels correspond to the German lowercase and uppercase letters and can be reached by switching as usual layouts.  The third level can be reached via the Mod3 , which under QWERTZ corresponds to the Caps Lock key and the # key, and contains common punctuation and special characters.  Binary and trigrams, which are commonly used in programming, in wikis, when chatting, or in the command line of common operating systems, have been taken into account in the design of this level.

The fourth level can be reached via Mod4 , which under QWERTY corresponds to the Alt Gr key and the < key, contains a numeric keypad and important navigation keys, so you do not have to take your hands off the main field to navigate in a text document.  By making the navigation buttons accessible on the main panel, Neo also encounters the criticism expressed in reform keyboards that text editors like Vim would be more difficult to use.  This level can be locked just like the second one.

The levels five ( Shift + Mod3 ) and six ( Mod3 + Mod4 ) finally contain small and capital letters in Greek as well as other mathematical and scientific signs.

Character variety and typography 
Neo allows the writing of virtually all languages with Latin-based alphabet, in particular because of  the dead keys and additional Compose combinations, of which Neo brings many of its own. The dead keys are located at the top left and right and allow combining the following characters with the corresponding diacritic when hitting the key.

Thus, not only grave, acute and circumflex, but also many other diacritics such as the ring, breve and macron are possible, including the novel dead button "turning" ↻ , for example, from the sign a one can create an ɐ.  Together with the fifth level, Neo can be used to create Greek as well as international phonetic alphabet symbols.  Nevertheless Neo is clearly designed for the German language; for others a change in programming is necessary.

Furthermore, meaningful Unicode characters were placed on the keyboard for which otherwise a character table would have to suffice, or which would otherwise not be so easy to achieve.  These characters include the common quotes ("..."), the dash (-), the real apostrophe (') and the chevrons commonly used in books and newspapers (« »).  In addition, the Capital ẞ, standardized in June 2008, is also available.

Mathematics and special characters 
On the levels five and six one reaches the Greek letters and numerous characters required for the formula theorem, for example symbols for sets (∩ , ∪ , ⊂ ), logic ( ¬ , ∨ , ∧ , ⇔ ), derivatives ( ∂ , ∇ ), and many more.  By means of the Compose key, for example, the sequence Compose + = + ⊂ can be used to generate the subset symbol, ⊆ ', which also contains the equality.

In addition, the following characters are available with the keyboard layout: biological characters ( ♀ , ♂ , ⚥ ), arrows (↦, ←), physical constants ( ℏ ) and graphic symbols (✔, ✘, ☺).

Genesis 
The initial version 1 was introduced in 2004 by Hanno Behrens on the mailing list of the de ergo keyboard.  The name Neo is a recursive acronym and originally stood for NEO Ergonomic Oops , so "NEO", later the interpretation was set to Neo ergonomically optimized .

Considered were experiences of the Dvorak keyboard layout (around 1932), the ergonomic layout of Helmut Meier (1954) and some later investigations as well as attempts to have an ideal occupancy calculated by algorithms alone.  Instead of treading only a purely mathematical or purely experimental way, as is the case with previous ergonomic layouts, Neo takes both findings into account and combines these with consideration of the ergonomics and the quickly memorable arrangement of the keys.  Thus, Neo relies on the one hand on statistical surveys, in particular the distribution of letters in German and other languages, and on the other hand on studies on ergonomics by Walter Rohmert, the MARSAN Institute (1979) or Malt (1977).

In 2005, Neo 1.1 started thinking about how to arrange the keys that are often needed when programming.  In it are brackets and special characters on the main field with the help of the key Mod3 , which corresponds to the Qwerty caps lock key and the # button and the button Mod4 , which under QWERTY the key Alt Gr and the key < corresponds to reach.

Neo 2 
Release 2, released on March 29, 2010, introduces these changes:

 In the main level, the keys X, J and Q were swapped cyclically.
 The special character level 3 has been completely reworked, as the corresponding shift keys are more accessible.
 The higher levels 4-6 were introduced.

Platforms 
Since late 2006, Neo has been included in Linux as a variant of the German keyboard layout for the X Window System X.Org in all current distributions.

Drivers are downloadable on the project page for common platforms, including Linux, Windows, Mac OS, BSD and Solaris. In addition, free learning software is available for Linux, Windows and Mac OS. The neo-learning software is an official part of the KTouch project.

Under ChromeOS, Neo can be found in the German language settings.

Google's Gboard Keyboard for Android supports Neo2.

References

Latin-script keyboard layouts